Hibiscus dioscorides is a species of flowering plant in the family Malvaceae. It is found only in Yemen. Its natural habitat is rocky areas.

References

dioscorides
Endemic flora of Socotra
Data deficient plants
Taxonomy articles created by Polbot